Hideharu Hara (born 22 March 1965) is a Japanese volleyball player. He competed in the men's tournament at the 1988 Summer Olympics.

References

1965 births
Living people
Japanese men's volleyball players
Olympic volleyball players of Japan
Volleyball players at the 1988 Summer Olympics
Sportspeople from Kagoshima Prefecture